T. J. English (born October 6, 1957) is an American author and journalist known primarily for his non-fiction books about the Irish mob, organized crime, criminal justice and the American underworld.

Biography

T. J. English was born in Tacoma, Washington and grew up in an Irish Catholic family of ten children.  His father was a steelworker and his mother a social worker for Catholic Charities. After graduating from Loyola Marymount University in Los Angeles in 1980, English worked as a high school teacher in East Los Angeles.

In 1981, he moved to New York City to pursue a career as a writer, working in a series of odd jobs including bartender, janitor, and most notably, taxi driver for three years, while working as a freelance journalist. Of driving a taxi English has said, "I think of it as a metaphor for what I do as a writer."

Works
His first book, The Westies: Inside The Hell's Kitchen Irish Mob (1990), is a best-selling account of an Irish American gang in the Hell's Kitchen neighborhood of New York City. The Westies operated primarily in the 1970s and 1980s, though the roots of the gang go all the way back to the Prohibition Era.

In 1995, English published Born to Kill, about a Vietnamese gang based in New York City's Chinatown. The book was nominated for an Edgar Award in the category of Best Fact Crime.

Paddy Whacked, published in 2005, is a sweeping history of the Irish American gangster from the time of the Irish famine to the present day. Paddy Whacked was adapted as a two-hour documentary broadcast on the History Channel in 2006.

Havana Nocturne (published in the U.K. as The Havana Mob), presents the story of a U.S. mobster infiltration of Cuba in the 1950s. Published in 2008, the book rose to No. 7 on the New York Times best seller list and was also nominated for an Edgar Award.

With The Savage City (2011), English turned his attention to racial tension in New York City in the 1960s and early 1970s, when the framing of a young black male for a horrific double murder he did not commit touched off an era of hostility between the NYPD and the emerging Black Liberation Movement. The book was also a New York Times best seller.

In March 2018, English published The Corporation: An Epic Story of the Cuban American Underworld. This book focused mainly on the organized crime wars of the mid-'80s. Mainly centered around Jose Battle AKA "El Gordo" and his Bolita (Cuban lottery, "little ball") empire, the book delves into the horrific violence surrounding the Bolita racket between the Cubans and the Italian/Sicilian mob.

Journalism

In the 1980s, while driving a taxi at night, English wrote for Irish America magazine, which led to his first book, The Westies. Later, he wrote a series of articles for Playboy entitled "The New Mob", which explored the new face of organized crime. He went on to write major feature articles for Esquire, New York Magazine, The Village Voice, the now-defunct Brooklyn Bridge Magazine, and other publications.

In 2010, English wrote "Dope", an article for Playboy, about a DEA agent in Cleveland who was indicted for framing innocent African Americans on bogus narcotics charges. The article was cited by the New York Press Club for Best Crime Reporting. With "Narco Americano", published in Playboy in 2011, English examined the narco war in Mexico after spending time in the Ciudad Juarez-El Paso border area.

Other Writing
Also a screenwriter, English has written episodes of the television crime dramas NYPD Blue and Homicide: Life on the Streets. He shared a Humanitas Prize with David Simon and Julie Martin for the episode "Shades of Gray".

References

External links
 T.J. English official website
'Havana' Revisited: An American Gangster in Cuba NPR, June 5, 2009

1957 births
Living people
American male non-fiction writers
American people of Irish descent
Non-fiction writers about organized crime in the United States